The origins of bowling in Spain are uncertain, but legend says that over a thousand years ago, at the time of the primitive Castile, the Highlanders bet their weapons and even the horses that used to fight the Arabs in contested and passionate bowls matches. It is even said that the warring Cantabrians that inhabited the north of Spain challenged each other in bowling matches before frighten the imperial legions of Augustus.

There are many different bowls games around  Spain (more than 20) but Cantabria, Castile and León, Basque Country, and Asturias, are the places where there are a greater number of variants. One of the most spectacular games are the "Bolos Tres Tablones" (bowls three boards),  which is originally from Las Merindades, in the north of Spain.

The bowling alley is divided into three different areas: The launching area, pin area and "Birle" area. The bowling balls have finger and hand-holes, are 26–28 cm in diameter and usually weight between 6 and 8 kg. There are three boards (tablones or cureñas) and three pins on each one; there is a small pin which is situated outside of the boards and is the most important one.
    
The game starts by throwing the bowling ball from the launching area (cas) by the air trying to bring down as many pins as possible and the small pin (mico) inclusive. The first bounce of the bowling ball must be in the board, otherwise it will be cancelled (morra) and we won't get any point. Scoring is as follows: each pin knocked down its worthone point, the medium pin exclusive worth two points, and the demolition of the small pin (mico) is worth four points, only if another pin has been knocked down.

External links
www.bolos3tablones.com
Bowls Tres Tablones in Twitter
YouTube Videos
Spanish Bowling Federation

Bowls
Bowling